The J.O. Ranch Rural Historic Landscape is a historic area that incorporates the J.O. Ranch, established in 1885 in Carbon County, Wyoming. The ranch operated under the Spanish tradition of low-altitude winter ranch and high-altitude summer range. The ranching operation expanded greatly after the hard winter of 1886-87 devastated the cattle ranching industry in the area. Ranch buildings date from about 1890. Construction is log and stone, with many well-preserved structures.

The J.O. Ranch has continued as a working ranch since its establishment. It was listed on the National Register of Historic Places in on November 22, 2010.

References

External links
 JO Ranch at the National Park Service weekly update
 JO Ranch at Historicorps
 JO Ranch Rural Historic Landscape  at the Wyoming State Historic Preservation Office

National Register of Historic Places in Carbon County, Wyoming
Ranches in Wyoming